Joan Anim-Addo is a Grenadian-born academic, poet, playwright and publisher, who is Emeritus Professor of Caribbean Literature and Culture in the English and Creative Writing Department at Goldsmiths, University of London.

Academic career
Born in Grenada in the Caribbean, Joan Amin-Addo joined the faculty of Goldsmiths, University of London, in 1994, as founder and Director of the Centre for Caribbean and Diaspora Studies.

She has taught at Vassar College in the USA and lectured at many universities internationally, including SUNY Geneseo (USA), the University of Turku in Finland and the University of Trento (Italy). She has also led workshops on creative non-fiction writing.

At Goldsmiths, she is the convenor for the undergraduate options "Caribbean Women's Writing" and "Black British Literature", as well as convenor of the "Literature of the Caribbean and its Diasporas" pathway within the Comparative Literary Studies MA programme. She is also co-convenor, with Deirdre Osborne, of the world's first MA in Black British Writing, which Hannah Pool described as a "landmark for black culture", while novelist Alex Wheatle sees it adding "to the fabric of British literature".

Publishing and writing
In 1995 Anim-Addo founded Mango Publishing, specialising in the "Caribbean voice", with a particular focus on women's writing, the Mango list featuring books by such writers as Beryl Gilroy, Velma Pollard and Jacob Ross.

In 2008 Anim-Addo wrote the libretto to Imoinda, a re-writing of Aphra Behn's Oroonoko (first published in 1688). Anim-Addo's other published work includes poetry collections — Haunted by History in 2004 and Janie: Cricketing Lady in 2006 – and a literary history, Touching the Body: History, Language and African-Caribbean Women's Writing (2007). She co-edited I Am Black, White, Yellow: An Introduction to the Black Body in Europe and Interculturality and Gender (2009), and is the founder-editor of New Mango Season, a journal of Caribbean women's writing.

In December 2016 Anim-Addo was honoured with a Lifetime Achievement Award for "invaluable contributions to literature and to literary and cultural studies" by the literary quarterly journal Callaloo.

In 2021, with Deirdre Osborne and Kadija Sesay she curated This is The Canon: Decolonize Your Bookshelf in 50 Books – in the words of Nikesh Shukla "a vital and timely introduction to some of the best books I've ever read" – which is described as "[s]subverting the reading lists that have long defined Western cultural life", highlighting alternatives by people of African or Asian descent and indigenous peoples.

Selected bibliography
 Longest Journey: A History of Black Lewisham,  Deptford Forum Publishing, 1995, 
 Framing the Word: Gender & Genre in Caribbean Women's Writing (editor), Whiting & Birch, 1996
 Sugar, Spices And Human Cargo: An Early Black History of Greenwich, Greenwich Leisure Services, 1996
 Haunted by History: Poetry, Mango Publishing, 2004, 
 Another Doorway Visible Inside the Museum (editor), Mango Publishing, 2004
 Janie: Cricketing Lady : a Journey Poem (1920s–2004) : Carnival and Hurricane Poems, Mango Publishing, 2006, 
 I Am Black/White/Yellow: An Introduction to the Black Body in Europe (co-editor, with Suzanne Scafe), Mango Publishing, 2007 
 Imoinda, or She Who Will Lose Her Name: A Play for Twelve Voices in Three Acts, Mango Publishing, 2008
 (With Deirdre Osborne and Kadija Sesay) This is the Canon: Decolonize Your Bookshelves in 50 Books (London: Greenfinch/Quercus, 2021; .

References

External links
 "Joan Anim-Addo Inaugural Lecture". 2015 Centre for Caribbean and Diaspora Studies re-launch.

Living people
Black British women academics
Academics of Goldsmiths, University of London
21st-century women writers
British publishers (people)
Grenadian women poets
Grenadian women writers
Year of birth missing (living people)
Grenadian emigrants to the United Kingdom
Grenadian dramatists and playwrights